Interstate 87 (I-87) is a partially completed Interstate Highway in the US state of North Carolina, the shortest designated primary Interstate Highway at . The completed portion is in eastern Wake County, between Raleigh and Wendell; the majority of the completed route (approximately ) is known as the Knightdale Bypass, while the remaining  follows the Raleigh Beltline (I-440). It is planned to continue northeast through Rocky Mount, Williamston, and Elizabeth City, ending in Norfolk, Virginia. It is signed as north–south, in keeping with the sign convention for most odd-numbered interstates, but the route goes primarily east–west, with the eastern direction aligning to the north designation. The entire route is concurrent with US Highway 64 (US 64), with portions also concurrent with I-440 and US 264.

Route description
I-87 is a six-lane Interstate Highway that connects I-40, in Raleigh, to Rolesville Road, in Wendell; it is entirely concurrent with US 64.

The southern terminus is at the interchange of I-40 and I-440 (Raleigh Beltline) in Southeast Raleigh, at I-40 exit 301/I-440 exit 16. I-87 north follows I-440 west for approximately  before exiting the Beltline at exit 14 to follow the US 64/US 264 (former I-495) freeway, known locally as the Knightdale Bypass. Following the Bypass south of Knightdale, I-87 has interchanges with two local roads (New Hope Road and Hodge Road) before meeting the eastern terminus of I-540. Two more local roads follow (Smithfield Road and Wendell Falls Parkway) before the I-87 designation ends at a complex interchange with US 64 Business (US 64 Bus.)/Knightdale Boulevard/Wendell Boulevard and Rolesville Road.

A portion of this freeway (from I-440 to I-540) was formerly designated I-495 from 2013 to 2017. I-495 signs were removed, and mileage markers and exit numbers were changed to reflect the redesignation in May 2019.

Beyond Rolesville Road, the US 64 freeway from Wendell to Williamston is designated as Future I-87. It does not meet interstate highway standards and will need wider travel lanes, wider shoulders and Jersey barriers added in the grass median. The remainder to the Virginia border is not built as a limited access freeway and will require expansion parallel to existing US Highways, including US 13, US 17, and US 158.

History

Interstate 495

A portion of I-87, originally named I-495, was first designated as an Interstate Highway on February 20, 2013, when the North Carolina Department of Transportation (NCDOT) submitted a request to the American Association of State Highway and Transportation Officials (AASHTO) in order to establish I-495 as a new auxiliary route of I-95. The proposed  route would begin at I-440/US 64/US 64 Bus. in Raleigh and would end at I-95, in Rocky Mount, completely concurrent with US 64.

On March 15, 2013, AASHTO received a modified request from NCDOT requesting the establishment of I-495 from I-440 to I-540 and Future I-495 from I-540 to I-95. It was approved, though needed an additional approval from the Federal Highway Administration (FHWA). On December 12, 2013, the proposed section was approved by the FHWA and was added to the interstate highway system.

The freeway section, the part that was originally to be signed I-495 and continuing east to US 64 Bus., was completed in 2006. From I-440 to Rolesville Road, the freeway was built to Interstate standards, which is why the first official section of I-495 was able to connect between I-440 and I-540. East of Rolesville Road, the freeway was built in sections, since 1975. This older section of freeway will eventually be expanded to Interstate standards, which include road rehabilitation and wider lanes and shoulders.

Renumbering

Long-term plans by the Raleigh–Durham area's Regional Transportation Alliance (RTA) called for extension of the interstate east of I-95 toward Elizabeth City, then northeastward to the I-64/I-464 interchange in Hampton Roads. NCDOT proposed the Interstate 44 designation for the Raleigh–Norfolk High Priority Corridor consisting of portions of the I-495 and US 64 in North Carolina and US 17 in North Carolina and Virginia. The route would connect two of the largest US metropolitan areas lacking an Interstate connection: the Research Triangle area around Raleigh and the Hampton Roads area around Norfolk.

NCDOT requested the addition of the corridor to the Interstate Highway System as I-44 in November 2012. Representative G. K. Butterfield introduced legislation in June 2014 to add the corridor to the Interstate Highway System through Congressional authority. An NCDOT policy paper said they were "seeking language in the reauthorization of surface transportation programs legislation to enhance the description of the Raleigh–Norfolk Corridor to include the route via Rocky Mount–Elizabeth City for clarity, and to designate the entire route from Raleigh to Norfolk as a future part of the Interstate system as I-44 or I-50". Had the I-44 designation been approved, it would have been discontinuous with the current I-44, which runs between Wichita Falls, Texas, and St. Louis, Missouri.

The proposed corridor was officially designated as a future interstate with the passage of the Fixing America's Surface Transportation Act (FAST Act) on December 14, 2015. Soon, several other route numbers were discussed and the RTA set their preference on two more-likely candidates: I-56 if an east–west designation were chosen or I-89 if a north–south designation were chosen. I-56 is not in use, while I-89 exists in Vermont and New Hampshire, far north of this corridor. For the upcoming AASHTO Special Committee on US Route Numbering, NCDOT proposed I-89 for this route. On May 25, 2016, AASHTO instead approved I-87 as the number for the highway. The new I-87 would be noncontiguous with the route with the same number in New York. The I-87 designation pays tribute to several important dates in the history of both North Carolina and Virginia: the Roanoke Colony was founded in 1587, James Madison's Virginia Plan helped to develop the US Constitution in 1787, and North Carolina State University was created in 1887.

On May 23, 2017, AASHTO approved the request by NCDOT to decommission existing I-495 and Future I-495; they were replaced by I-87 and Future I-87. I-87 signage were installed on September 5, 2017; in May 2019 milemarkers and exit numbers were changed along the already completed segment from the I-440 junction to Rolesville Road. Exit numbers and mileage along the portion coincident with I-440 will retain I-440 mileage and exit numbers. I-87 will continue east along US 64 to I-95 after the road is expanded to Interstate standards.

Future
I-87 will extend from its current terminus at Rolesville Road to an undetermined location in Norfolk, Virginia. Existing plans have the Interstate running east along US 64 to Williamston. This section of US 64 is built as a freeway but will need to be improved to Interstate Highway standards. In Williamston, the Interstate is planned to leave US 64 and begin following an alignment along present-day US 17.

A feasibility study for the section between Williamston and the Virginia state line was completed in 2018. NCDOT maps show the Interstate roughly following the US 17 corridor between Williamston and South Mills. There are several areas where the Interstate may deviate from the current routing of US 17 and be placed on a new freeway. To the north of South Mills, NCDOT has laid out two plans on how the Interstate would proceed to Virginia. One plan shows I-87 running north along US 17 to the Virginia state line. In contrast, a second plan shows an interchange with I-87 and US 17 just north of modern-day McPherson Road and the Dismal Swamp Welcome Center. I-87 would then proceed to the east along new routing to North Carolina Highway 168 (NC 168)/State Route 168 (SR 168). The interchange with Route 168 would take place just north of the North Carolina–Virginia state line. If NCDOT was to choose this alignment as the preferred route, I-87 would presumably follow SR 168 to Norfolk. NCDOT estimates that the section between Williamston and the Virginia state line could cost between $849.7 million and $945.2 million.

Some of these expansions are part of the NCDOT 10-year plan released in 2017, with expansion of highways around Elizabeth City given a start date of 2023.

, Virginia does not have a timetable to complete their section of I-87. US 17 is a four-lane expressway between the North Carolina state line and Norfolk. North of Battlefield Boulevard, SR 168 is a four-lane tolled limited access freeway known as the Chesapeake Expressway.

Exit list
Exit numbers were signed in May 2019.

Auxiliary routes
I-87 in North Carolina has one spur route, I-587 to Greenville. However, the westernmost segment of I-587 that would connect with I-87 near Wendell is still marked as US 264 (and Future I-587) until it is upgraded to current Interstate Highway standards.

See also

References

External links

 Interstate-Guide: Interstate 495 North Carolina
 Future I-87 in North Carolina

 
87
495 North Carolina
Transportation in Raleigh, North Carolina
Transportation in Wake County, North Carolina